Boyz-n-Blue is the debut studio album by American hip hop group Boss Hogg Outlawz. It was released independently on April 20, 2004 through their own Boss Hogg Outlawz record label. The album was released as a 2-disc set with one side featuring the original mix and the other featuring the songs chopped and screwed. Leroy "Mr. Lee" Williams produced all the songs on the album while DJ Yellaboy provided the chopped and screwed mix on disc two.

Though more of a local success than a commercial hit, Boyz-n-Blue spent one week on the Billboard Top R&B/Hip-Hop Albums, peaking at number 78 during the week of May 8, 2004.

Track listing

Personnel
Stayve Jerome Thomas – performer (tracks: 1-6, 8-16), executive producer
Kyle Jeroderrick Riley – performer (tracks: 2-6, 8-13, 15-16)
T. Harris – performer (tracks: 2-5, 9, 11, 13-14)
Chris Ward – performer (tracks: 4-5, 8, 10, 12, 14-16)
Lil' Mel – performer (track 10)
Dre Day – performer (track 15)
Leroy Williams, Jr. – producer (tracks: 1-16)
Dj Yella Boy – mixing (tracks: 17-31)
Raymond Thomas – executive producer
Mike Frost – artwork, photography

Charts

References

External links

Boyz N Blue by Slim Thug & Boss Hogg Outlawz on iTunes

2004 debut albums
Slim Thug albums
Boss Hogg Outlawz albums